Qhuyu Parwayuni (Aymara qhuya, qhuyu mine, parwayu blossom of cereals, -ni a suffix to indicate ownership, Hispanicized spelling Ccuyo Parhuayuni) is a  mountain in the Andes of Peru. It is located in the Moquegua Region, General Sánchez Cerro Province, Ubinas District. Qhuyu Parwayuni is situated north of the active Ubinas volcano and south of Parwayuni.

References 

Mountains of Moquegua Region
Mountains of Peru